CSEC may refer to:

 Calgary Sports and Entertainment Corporation, owner and operator of several Calgary-based sports teams
 Caribbean Secondary Education Certificate
 Communications Security Establishment Canada, later known as the Communications Security Establishment, the Canadian government's national cryptologic agency
 Commercial sexual exploitation of children
 Commission on State Emergency Communications, an agency of the State of Texas; see Steve Mitchell
 Citadel Security Services, in the computer game Mass Effect